The Albanian is the only indigenous horse breed in Albania. It is a small horse, and similar to other Balkan horses. Two types are distinguished, a mountain type and a lowland type, which may be called "Myzeqeja" after the lowland Myzeqeja region.

History
Before the communist era in Albania, the Albanian horse had a good reputation for endurance and stamina. From 1904 Arab stock was used for cross-breeding; Haflinger and Nonius stock was later used.

Use
The horse was until recently the principal means of transport in the country, which had no tractors: it was thus essential to the national economy. Horses were used by the Albanian military until 1974. The Albanian horse is used almost exclusively in harness or as a pack animal, and only occasionally for riding.

References

Horse breeds
Horse breeds originating in Albania